Karl Karlsson (16 November 1887 – 8 April 1964) was a Swedish wrestler. He competed in the featherweight event at the 1912 Summer Olympics.

References

Olympic wrestlers of Sweden
Wrestlers at the 1912 Summer Olympics
Swedish male sport wrestlers
1887 births
1964 deaths